Femininism is the promotion or appreciation of femininity or "womanliness", and is the direct counterpart to masculinism. The concept originates as far back as the 19th century. It is a philosophy of elevating and attempting to live by traits or virtues that accentuate the femininity of women, while still supporting intellectual equality between the sexes. It is acceptance of womanhood as strength.

Femininism is influenced by queer theory and disassociates female qualities from sex. It is a celebration of qualities typically considered female and supports the adoption of these qualities by both women and men.

Feminism is a similar term and sometimes used interchangeably with femininism, but more specifically refers to the advocacy of the rights and interests of women and girls with the goal of gender equality, and is the direct counterpart to masculism.

Medical term
Both feminism and femininism have been used in a strictly medical connotation to describe men or boys that lack virilism or exhibit female secondary sex traits, such as development of breasts, and has been associated with the ancient Greek concept of hermaphroditism.

Additional reading

 1899: The Contemporary Review - Volume 76 - Page 824 "girls worked indirectly, and were careful not to hoist the flag of femininism. They held to the motto of Erminia Fus Fusinato, a poetess and the foundress of several educational institutions: "In my opinion the emancipation of woman means emancipation from want and ignorance." Page 830 "The Italian workwoman, thanks to her native cleverness and intelligence, might become a powerful ally for the cause of femininism. The leaders of the movement understand this, and lose no opportunity..." Page 831 "It is true that the "New Woman" in Italy is relatively prudent and abstains from vapouring against the marriage bond. It is also true that there are among the leaders of the movement some able individuals. But new ideas inevitably attract to themselves the discontented, the eccentric, the anarchic, those seeking an outlet. One of the apostles of French femininism, M. Jules..."
 The Economic Dependence of Women by Vernon Lee from The North American Review, Vol. 175, No. 548 (Jul., 1902), pp. 71-90 (Page 72) "it does not quire the generalizing genius of Dr. Nordau, clapping Tolstoy and Ibsen into his specimen-box of "Degenerates," to tell us that the Woman Question, Femininism, is likely to be taken up by those disconnected and disjointed personalities who are attracted by every other kind of thing in ism; whose power consists of a little in their very inferiority; and whose abnormal and often morbid "pleasure in saying 'no'" (as Nietzsche puts it) is, after all, alas! so very necessary in this world of quite normally stupid and normally selfish and normally virtuous "pleasure in saying 'yes'"</ref>
 A BRIEF HISTORY OF EARLY CHINESE PHILOSOPHY. ETHICS by D. Teitaro Suzuki from The Monist, Vol. 18, No. 2 (APRIL, 1908), pp. 242-285 (Page 260) "The doctrine of Wu Wei is in its passivity the ethics of femininism. It teaches submissive humiliation, moderation, meekness, and often nonchalance; though, according to Lao-tze, these things are not prized for their intrinsic virtue, but as the means of attaining the end of self-preservation or self-affirmation."
 Recent Literature from American Journal of Sociology, Vol. 14, No. 4 (Jan., 1909), pp. 553-576 (Page 570) "Lightbody, W.M. Femininism in Politics. Westminster Rev. 170:409, Oct. '08"
 Brief Mention by J. W. B., M. L. B., W. K. from Modern Language Notes, Vol. 33, No. 8 (Dec., 1918), pp. 506-512 (Page 511) "We might question, however, his suggested application of Greek ideals to modern problems of labor and "femininism." Versatile and practical as the Greeks were, they never arrived at any working solution of their own problems of manual labor and feminine activity in the state; and, failing in this, their political organism could not survive its first brilliant and hopeful promise in the oligarchical democracy of Athens."
 Indoor Dress by Janet Duer, Vincent Collins from Art & Life, Vol. 11, No. 5 (Nov., 1919), pp. 282-287 (Page 283) "In such gowns every mark of femininism is emphasized that a woman may lay aside all indications of being one of a well-ordered number of women dressed for a certain occasion in a conventional manner, and become really herself."

References

Philosophy of life
Femininity